Patchwork is the eleventh studio album by English singer-songwriter Passenger. It was released on 10 July 2020 by Black Crow Records. All profits from the album go to The Trussell Trust, a registered NGO and charity that works to end the need for food banks in the United Kingdom.

Background 
Passenger wrote and recorded the album during the 2020 COVID-19 lockdown, alongside producer Chris Vallejo and guest musicians Andrew Phillips (formerly of the band Passenger alongside Rosenberg) and Richard Brinklow. The album consists of eight tracks, including a cover of the 2018 Lewis Capaldi single "Someone You Loved". The album was released only digitally, on various streaming and digital download services. All revenues from the album will be donated to The Trussell Trust's food banks campaign. In announcing the album, Passenger wrote on Instagram that the songs were "a massive source of hope and comfort to me" during the "strange and lonely feeling" of being stuck at home, and that "the whole album comes from an extremely honest and vulnerable place". He also wrote that the album was dedicated to his newborn baby niece, Skye.

Track listing

Charts

Release history

References 

2020 albums
Passenger (singer) albums